Makrygianni is a neighbourhood in the city of Patras, Achaea, Greece.

Neighborhoods in Patras